Stephen Humphrey Bogart (born January 6, 1949) is an American writer, producer, and businessman.  He is the only son of actor Humphrey Bogart and actress Lauren Bacall, and authored three semi-autobiographical books about his family.

Early life
Bogart was born on January 6, 1949, in Los Angeles, California, to Lauren Bacall and Humphrey Bogart at the Cedars of Lebanon Hospital.  Bogart  and his younger sister, Leslie, were raised in the Holmby Hills neighborhood of Los Angeles, where his neighbors, who were also family friends, were Judy Garland and Frank Sinatra.  After his father died in 1957, the family moved to New York City, where his mother had bought an apartment at The Dakota.  His half-brother is the actor Sam Robards, son of Bacall and her second husband, Jason Robards.  His mother enrolled Bogart at the Milton Academy, where he graduated in 1967.  Afterward, he enrolled in the University of Pennsylvania and majored in English. He reported that he was unhappy with this, and changed to Boston University in 1969.  Bogart met his first wife, Dale Gemelli, there.  The couple married in 1969.

Career
Bogart began his working career as an insurance agent, while he studied mass communications at the University of Hartford.  He pursued a career in television news, and at the age of 39, he moved from New York to become a producer for NBC's Sunday Today.  Later, he took a job as an executive producer of a television news department.

Bogart oversees the management of the estate of Humphrey Bogart.  The business owns and manages the name, image, and likeness rights of Humphrey Bogart.  The estate hosts an annual Humphrey Bogart Film Festival in Key Largo, Florida. The estate owns and manages Santana Films, the successor to Humphrey Bogart's company, Santana Productions.  The business is also the founding partner of the 'Bogart Spirits' liquor brand.

Bogart hosted the festival celebrating the 70th and 75th anniversary of the film Casablanca (which his father starred in) in 2012 and 2017.

Personal life 
Bogart has three adult children and currently lives in Naples, Florida.  He is the brother-in-law of author and yoga master Erich Schiffmann.

Works 
His books are Bogart: In Search of My Father, Play it Again, and The Remake: As Time Goes By.

References

External links 
 Bogart's official Facebook profile

Living people
1949 births
People from the Upper West Side
People from Naples, Florida
People from Holmby Hills, Los Angeles
American people of Dutch descent
American people of English descent
American people of Romanian-Jewish descent
American people of Russian-Jewish descent
American television news producers
American writers
Milton Academy alumni
University of Pennsylvania alumni
Boston University alumni
University of Hartford alumni
Insurance agents
Writers from Los Angeles
Writers from Manhattan
Television producers from Florida